Celery (Apium graveolens) is a marshland plant in the family Apiaceae that has been cultivated as a vegetable since antiquity. Celery has a long fibrous stalk tapering into leaves. Depending on location and cultivar, either its stalks, leaves or hypocotyl are eaten and used in cooking.  Celery seed powder is used as a spice.

Description
The flowers are creamy-white,  in diameter, and are produced in dense compound umbels. Modern cultivars have been selected for either solid petioles, leaf stalks, or a large hypocotyl. A celery stalk readily separates into "strings" which are bundles of angular collenchyma cells exterior to the vascular bundles.

Celery is a biennial plant that occurs around the globe. It produces flowers and seeds only during its second year. The first cultivation is thought to have happened in the Mediterranean region, where the natural habitats were salty and wet, or marshy soils near the coast where celery grew in agropyro-rumicion-plant communities.

North of the Alps, wild celery is found only in the foothill zone on soils with some salt content. It prefers moist or wet, nutrient rich, muddy soils. It cannot be found in Austria and is increasingly rare in Germany.

Etymology
The earliest attested form of the word is the Mycenaean Greek se-ri-no, written in Linear B syllabic script.

Taxonomy

Celery was described by Carl Linnaeus in Volume One of his Species Plantarum in 1753.

Cultivation
Development of self-blanching varieties of celery, which do not need to be earthed up, dominate both the commercial and amateur market.

Celery was first grown as a winter and early spring vegetable. It was considered a cleansing tonic to counter the deficiencies of a winter diet based on salted meats without fresh vegetables. By the 19th century, the season for celery in England had been extended, to last from the beginning of September to late in April.

North America
In North America, commercial production of celery is dominated by the cultivar called 'Pascal' celery. Gardeners can grow a range of cultivars, many of which differ from the wild species, mainly in having stouter leaf stems. They are ranged under two classes, white and red.
The stalks grow in tight, straight, parallel bunches, and are typically marketed fresh that way. They are sold without roots and only a small amount of green leaf remaining.

The stalks can be eaten raw, or as an ingredient in salads, or as a flavoring in soups, stews, and pot roasts.

Europe
In Europe, another popular variety  is celeriac (also known as celery root), Apium graveolens var. rapaceum, grown because its hypocotyl forms a large bulb, white on the inside. The bulb can be kept for months in winter and mostly serves as a main ingredient in soup. It can also be shredded and used in salads.
The leaves are used as seasoning; the small, fibrous stalks find only marginal use.

Asia

Leaf celery (Chinese celery, Apium graveolens var. secalinum) is a cultivar from East Asia that grows in marshlands.  Leaf celery has characteristically thin skin stalks and a stronger taste and smell compared to other cultivars.  It is used as a flavoring in soups and sometimes pickled as a side dish.

Wild
The wild form of celery is known as "smallage". It has a furrowed stalk with wedge-shaped leaves, the whole plant having a coarse, earthy taste, and a distinctive smell. The stalks are not usually eaten (except in soups or stews in French cuisine), but the leaves may be used in salads, and its seeds are those sold as a spice. With cultivation and blanching, the stalks lose their acidic qualities and assume the mild, sweetish, aromatic taste particular to celery as a salad plant.

Because wild celery is rarely eaten, yet susceptible to the same diseases as more well-used cultivars, it is often removed from fields to help prevent transmission of viruses like celery mosaic virus.

Harvesting and storage

Harvesting occurs when the average size of celery in a field is marketable; due to extremely uniform crop growth, fields are harvested only once. The petioles and leaves are removed and harvested; celery is packed by size and quality (determined by color, shape, straightness and thickness of petiole, stalk and midrib length and absence of disease, cracks, splits, insect damage and rot). Inner stalks may continue growing if kept at temperatures above . Shelf life can be extended by packaging celery in anti-fogging, micro-perforated shrink wrap. Freshly cut petioles of celery are prone to decay, which can be prevented or reduced through the use of sharp blades during processing, gentle handling, and proper sanitation.

Celery stalk may be preserved through pickling by first removing the leaves, then boiling the stalks in water before finally adding vinegar, salt, and vegetable oil.

Sulfites
In the past, restaurants used to store celery in a container of water with powdered vegetable preservative, but it was found that the sulfites in the preservative caused allergic reactions in some people. In 1986, the U.S. Food and Drug Administration banned the use of sulfites on fruits and vegetables intended to be eaten raw.

Uses

Celery is eaten around the world as a vegetable. In North America and Europe the crisp petiole (leaf stalk) is used. In Europe the hypocotyl is also used as a root vegetable. The leaves are strongly flavored and are used less often, either as a flavoring in soups and stews or as a dried herb. Celery, onions, and bell peppers are the "holy trinity" of Louisiana Creole and Cajun cuisine. Celery, onions, and carrots make up the French mirepoix, often used as a base for sauces and soups. Celery is a staple in many soups. It is used in the Iranian stew khoresh.

Leaves
Celery leaves are frequently used in cooking to add a mild spicy flavor to foods, similar to, but milder than black pepper. Celery leaves are suitable dried as a sprinkled on seasoning for use with baked, fried or roasted fish, meats and as part of a blend of fresh seasonings suitable for use in soups and stews. They may also be eaten raw, mixed into a salad or as a garnish.

Seeds
In temperate countries, celery is also grown for its seeds. Actually very small fruit, these "seeds" yield a valuable essential oil that is used in the perfume industry. The oil contains the chemical compound apiole. Celery seeds can be used as flavoring or spice, either as whole seeds or ground.

Celery salt
Celery seeds can be ground and mixed with salt to produce celery salt. Celery salt can be made from an extract of the roots or by using dried leaves. Celery salt is used as a seasoning, in cocktails (commonly to enhance the flavor of Bloody Mary cocktails), on the Chicago-style hot dog, and in Old Bay Seasoning. Similarly, combinations of celery powder and salt are used to flavor and preserve cured pork and other processed meats as an alternative to industrial curing salt. The naturally occurring nitrites in celery work synergistically with the added salt to cure food.

Celery juice

In 2019, a trend of drinking celery juice was reported in the United States, based on "detoxification" claims posted on a blog. The claims have no scientific basis, but the trend caused a sizable spike in celery prices.

Nutrition

Raw celery is 95% water, 3% carbohydrates, 0.7% protein, and contains negligible fat (table). A  reference serving provides 16 calories of food energy, and is a rich source of vitamin K, providing 28% of the Daily Value, with no other micronutrients in significant content (table).

Allergies
Celery is among a small group of foods that may provoke allergic reactions; for people with celery allergy, exposure can cause potentially fatal anaphylactic shock. Cases of allergic reaction to ingestion of celery root have also been reported in pollen-sensitive individuals resulting in gastrointestinal disorders and other symptoms, although in most cases, celery sensitivity is not considered clinically significant. In the European Union and the United Kingdom, foods that contain or may contain celery, even in trace amounts, must be clearly marked.

The Apium graveolens plant has an OPALS allergy scale rating of 4 out of 10, indicating moderate potential to cause allergic reactions, exacerbated by over-use of the same plant throughout a garden. Celery has caused skin rashes and cross-reactions with carrots and ragweed.

Chemistry

The main chemicals responsible for the aroma and taste of celery are butylphthalide and sedanolide.

History

Daniel Zohary and Maria Hopf note that celery leaves and inflorescences were part of the garlands found in the tomb of pharaoh Tutankhamun (died 1323 BC), and celery mericarps dated to the seventh century BC were recovered in the Heraion of Samos. However, they note A. graveolens grows wild in these areas, it is hard to decide whether these remains represent wild or cultivated forms." Only by classical antiquity is it thought that celery was cultivated.

M. Fragiska mentions an archeological find of celery dating to the 9th century BC, at Kastanas; however, the literary evidence for ancient Greece is far more abundant. In Homer's Iliad, the horses of the Myrmidons graze on wild celery that grows in the marshes of Troy, and in Odyssey, there is mention of the meadows of violet and wild celery surrounding Calypso's Cave.

In the Capitulary of Charlemagne, compiled c. 800, apium appears, as does olisatum, or alexanders, among medicinal herbs and vegetables the Frankish emperor desired to see grown. At some later point in medieval Europe, celery displaced alexanders.

The name "celery" retraces the plant's route of successive adoption in European cooking, as the English "celery" (1664) is derived from the French céleri coming from the Lombard term, seleri, from the Latin selinon, borrowed from Greek.

Celery's late arrival in the English kitchen is an end-product of the long tradition of seed selection needed to reduce the sap's bitterness and increase its sugars. By 1699, John Evelyn could recommend it in his Acetaria. A Discourse of Sallets: "Sellery, apium Italicum, (and of the Petroseline Family) was formerly a stranger with us (nor very long since in Italy) is a hot and more generous sort of Macedonian Persley or Smallage... and for its high and grateful Taste is ever plac'd in the middle of the Grand Sallet, at our Great Men's tables, and Praetors feasts, as the Grace of the whole Board".

Celery makes a minor appearance in colonial American gardens; its culinary limitations are reflected in the observation by the author of A Treatise on Gardening, by a Citizen of Virginia that it is "one of the species of parsley". Its first extended treatment in print was in Bernard M'Mahon's American Gardener's Calendar (1806).

After the mid-19th century, continued selections for refined crisp texture and taste brought celery to American tables, where it was served in celery vases to be salted and eaten raw. Celery was so popular in the United States during the 19th century and early 20th century that the New York Public Library's historical menu archive shows that it was the third most popular dish in New York City menus during that time, behind only coffee and tea. In those days, celery cost more than caviar, as it was difficult to cultivate. There were also many varieties of celery back then that are no longer around because they are difficult to grow and do not ship well.

Cultural depictions

A chthonian symbol among the ancient Greeks, celery was said to have sprouted from the blood of Kadmilos, father of the Cabeiri, chthonian divinities celebrated in Samothrace, Lemnos, and Thebes. The spicy odor and dark leaf color encouraged this association with the cult of death. In classical Greece, celery leaves were used as garlands for the dead, and the wreaths of the winners at the Isthmian Games were first made of celery before being replaced by crowns made of pine. According to Pliny the Elderin  Achaea, the garland worn by the winners of the sacred Nemean Games was also made of celery. The Ancient Greek colony of Selinous (Selinous), on Sicily, was named after wild parsley that grew abundantly there; Selinountian coins depicted a parsley leaf as the symbol of the city.

See also

 Apium virus Y
 Celery mosaic virus
 Celery powder
 Celery vase
Liriomyza trifolii – celery leaf miner
 Vallisneria americana – wild celery
 List of vegetables

References

External links

 Apium graveolens in Plant Resources of Tropical Africa (PROTA)
 Quality standards, from the USDA website

 
Apium
Edible Apiaceae
Leaf vegetables
Medicinal plants
Spices
Stem vegetables
Taxa named by Carl Linnaeus
Aphrodisiac foods
Calypso (mythology)